Dessert (pronounced in English) is the first and only studio album of the Japanese idol girl group Chocolove from AKB48. The album was released on November 21, 2007, available in two editions: a limited edition containing a 24-page photobook and a regular edition.

Information 
The album peaked at the 99th place in the Oricon rankings, where it remained for one week. The album sold 2 383 copies, which included two singles (and their B-sides): Ashita wa Ashita no Kimi ga Umareru and Mail no Namida.
The B-side singles are versions performed by solo singers, like Chocolate (Ashita wa Ashita no Kimi ga Umareru B-side) and Kare no Kitchen (B-side Mail no Namida).

Track listing 
All tracks written by Yasushi Akimoto.

References

External links 
 Regular Edition profile at the Oricon website 

2007 debut albums
AKB48